Prince Kūhiō Day is an official holiday in the state of Hawaii in the United States.  It is celebrated annually on March 26, to mark the birth of Prince Jonah Kūhiō Kalanianaole — heir to the throne of the Kingdom of Hawaii, prince of the House of Kalākaua, and later territorial delegate to the United States Congress. It was established in 1949 by the legislature of the Territory of Hawaii. 

As a delegate, Kuhio authored the first Hawaii Statehood bill in 1919.  He also won passage of the Hawaiian Homes Act, creating the Hawaiian Homes Commission and setting aside  of land for Hawaiian homesteaders.  

Prince Kūhiō Day is one of only two holidays in the United States dedicated to royalty, the other being Hawaii's King Kamehameha Day on June 11.

References

Celebrations in Hawaii
March observances
1949 establishments in Hawaii
State holidays in the United States